Sofia Alaoui (born 1990 in Casablanca) is a French-Moroccan director and screenwriter. She is best known for her short film Qu'importe si les bêtes meurent.

Biography 
Born in Casablanca to a Moroccan father and a French mother, she grew up between Morocco and China. After graduating high school in Casablanca, she moved to Paris to study cinema. In 2017, she returned to Morocco to develop her own production company, Jiango Films.

Her first short fiction film, Kenza des choux, was screened at a number of festivals.

Her next film, Qu'importe si les bêtes meurent, was shot in the Atlas Mountains, featuring non-professional actors and dialogue exclusively in Tamazight. It won the Grand Jury Prize at the Sundance Film Festival in 2020, and the César for best short fiction film in 2021.

Alaoui's feature directorial debut, Animalia premiered at the 2023 Sundance Film Festival.

Filmography

Feature films
2023: Animalia

Short films 
 2013 : Le rêve de Cendrillon
 2015 : Les enfants de Naplouse (documentary broadcast on France 3 and TV5)
 2018 : Kenza des choux
 2019 : Qu'importe si les bêtes meurent
 2019 : Les vagues ou rien
 2020 : The Lake

References

External links 
 

Moroccan women film directors
Moroccan women writers
Moroccan screenwriters
1990 births
Living people